is a train station on the Kyoto Municipal Subway Tōzai Line in Yamashina-ku, Kyoto, Japan.

Lines
 
 (Station Number: T05)

Layout
The subway station has an island platform serving two tracks separated by platform screen doors.

References

Railway stations in Kyoto Prefecture
Railway stations in Japan opened in 1997